Chloe Chua (pinyin: Cài Kēyí) (born 7 January 2007) is a Singaporean violinist. She is the first prize winner in the Junior division of the 2018 Yehudi Menuhin International Competition for Young Violinists alongside Christian Li in Geneva, Switzerland. She is also the winner of the 24th Andrea Postacchini International Violin Competition in Category A.

Biography 
From Singapore, Chloe Chua was originally introduced to the violin at age 4 and to the piano at age 2.5 by her mother, who is a music educator. Her teacher is Yin Ke, who started teaching her at age 4 at the Nanyang Academy of Fine Arts and School of Young Talents String Section. She has performed across the world in locations such as the U.K., Italy, China, Thailand, Saudi Arabia, and Singapore, and in festivals such as the New Virtuosi Queenswood Masterclass and the Singapore Violin Festival, and Chingay Festival. Chua has also performed with the Singapore Symphony Orchestra, Xiamen Philharmonic Orchestra, Salzburg Chamber Soloists, Russian National Youth Orchestra, Kammerorchester Basel and the China Philharmonic Orchestra. In 2018, Chua and Christian Li were both awarded first prize in the Junior division of the Menuhin Competition.

After her Menuhin Competition performance was featured in the 2018 video "Is Ling Ling a GIRL?" by music YouTubers Brett Yang and Eddy Chen of  TwoSet Violin, the two visited Chua in September 2020 and held a master class session on the piece  Paganiniana  composed by violinist Nathan Milstein from The Caprice No.24 of Paganini. She also took part in a "Ling Ling Workout" with Chen and Yang, released in March 2021, and a later video skit released in May 2021.

Chua has played on violins such as an 1884 Vincenzo Postiglioni loaned from Dr. Peter Chew and a one-year loan on a 1625 Amati violin from Florian Leonhard Fine Violins.
She currently performs on a Peter Guarneri, Mantua 1729, on loan from the Rin Collection.

Awards and appearances 
 First prize winner, Junior division, Thailand International Strings Competition
 2015: Third prize winner, Junior division, Singapore National Piano and Violin Competition
 2016: First prize winner, Junior Category, Symphony 924 Young Talents Project
 2017: Third prize winner, 2nd Zhuhai International Mozart Competition for Young Musicians Violin Group A
 2017: First prize winner, Category A, 24th Andrea Postacchini Violin Competition
 2017: First prize winner, Junior division, Singapore National Piano and Violin Competition
 2018: First prize winner, Junior division, Yehudi Menuhin International Competition for Young Violinists

References

External links
Official website

21st-century violinists
Singaporean violinists
2007 births
Living people
Child classical musicians